Javon Romario East (born 22 March 1995) is a Jamaican professional footballer who plays as a striker for Liga FPD club Saprissa and the Jamaica national team.

Career

Club
He has played club football for Portmore United.  With East in the squad Portmore United won the 2017-2018 RSPL title.

In June 2019, East moved on loan to Santos de Guápiles in Costa Rica. In August 2020, he moved to fellow Costa Rican club San Carlos.

In July 2022 East joined Costa Rican giants Saprissa.

International
East made his international debut for Jamaica in January 2018 in a friendly against South Korea. He scored his first goal for the Reggae Boyz against Guyana on 19 November 2019.

In July 2021, East was initially named to Jamaica's squad for the 2021 CONCACAF Gold Cup, but soon after pulled out due to a hamstring injury and was replaced by Andre Gray.

International goals

Honours
Jamaica National Premier League: 2
2017–18,  2018–19

CFU Club Championship: 1 2019 CFU Club Champion

References

1995 births
Living people
Association football forwards
Jamaican footballers
Sportspeople from Kingston, Jamaica
Portmore United F.C. players
Santos de Guápiles footballers
A.D. San Carlos footballers
National Premier League players
Liga FPD players
Jamaica international footballers
Jamaican expatriate footballers
Expatriate footballers in Costa Rica
Jamaican expatriate sportspeople in Costa Rica
Deportivo Saprissa players